In computer science, weight-balanced binary trees (WBTs) are a type of self-balancing binary search trees that can be used to implement dynamic sets, dictionaries (maps) and sequences. These trees were introduced by Nievergelt and Reingold in the 1970s as trees of bounded balance, or BB[α] trees. Their more common name is due to Knuth.

A well known example is a Huffman coding of a corpus.

Like other self-balancing trees, WBTs store bookkeeping information pertaining to balance in their nodes and perform rotations to restore balance when it is disturbed by insertion or deletion operations. Specifically, each node stores the size of the subtree rooted at the node, and the sizes of left and right subtrees are kept within some factor of each other. Unlike the balance information in AVL trees (using information about the height of subtrees) and red–black trees (which store a fictional "color" bit), the bookkeeping information in a WBT is an actually useful property for applications: the number of elements in a tree is equal to the size of its root, and the size information is exactly the information needed to implement the operations of an order statistic tree, viz., getting the 'th largest element in a set or determining an element's index in sorted order.

Weight-balanced trees are popular in the functional programming community and are used to implement sets and maps in MIT Scheme, SLIB and implementations of Haskell.

Description
A weight-balanced tree is a binary search tree that stores the sizes of subtrees in the nodes. That is, a node has fields

 key, of any ordered type
 value (optional, only for mappings)
 left, right, pointer to node
 size, of type integer.

By definition, the size of a leaf (typically represented by a  pointer) is zero. The size of an internal node is the sum of sizes of its two children, plus one:. Based on the size, one defines the weight to be .

Operations that modify the tree must make sure that the weight of the left and right subtrees of every node remain within some factor  of each other, using the same rebalancing operations used in AVL tree: rotations and double rotations. Formally, node balance is defined as follows:

Here,  is a numerical parameter to be determined when implementing weight balanced trees.

is a necessary condition for the balancing algorithm to work.

Applying balancing correctly guarantees a tree of  elements will have height

While maintaining a tree with the minimum search cost requires four kinds of double rotations (LL, LR, RL, RR as in an AVL tree) in insert/delete operations, if we desire only logarithmic performance, LR and RL are the only rotations required in a single top-down pass.

Set operations and bulk operations
Several set operations have been defined on weight-balanced trees: union, intersection and set difference. Then fast bulk operations on insertions or deletions can be implemented based on these set functions. These set operations rely on two helper operations, Split and Join. With the new operations, the implementation of weight-balanced trees can be more efficient and highly-parallelizable.

If the two trees have the balanced weight, Join simply create a new node with left subtree , root  and right subtree . At this point a new node with left child , root  and right child  is created to replace c. The new node may invalidate the weight-balanced invariant. This can be fixed with a single or a double rotation assuming 
Split: To split a weight-balanced tree into two smaller trees, those smaller than key x, and those larger than key x, first draw a path from the root by inserting x into the tree. After this insertion, all values less than x will be found on the left of the path, and all values greater than x will be found on the right. By applying Join, all the subtrees on the left side are merged bottom-up using keys on the path as intermediate nodes from bottom to top to form the left tree, and the right part is symmetric. For some applications, Split also returns a boolean value denoting if x appears in the tree. This algorithm actually has nothing to do with any special properties of a weight-balanced tree, and thus is generic to other balancing schemes such as AVL trees.

The join algorithm is as follows:

 function joinRightWB(TL, k, TR)
     (l, k', c) = expose(TL)
     if balance(|TL|, |TR|) return Node(TL, k, TR)
     else 
         T' = joinRightWB(c, k, TR)
         (l', k', r') = expose(T')
         if (balance(|l|,|T'|)) return Node(l, k', T')
         else if (balance(|l|,|l'|) and balance(|l|+|l'|,|r'|))
              return rotateLeft(Node(l, k', T'))
         else return rotateLeft(Node(l, k', rotateRight(T'))
 function joinLeftWB(TL, k, TR)
     /* symmetric to joinRightWB */
 function join(TL, k, TR)
     if (heavy(TL, TR)) return joinRightWB(TL, k, TR)
     if (heavy(TR, TL)) return joinLeftWB(TL, k, TR)
     Node(TL, k, TR)

Node(l, k, r) means to create a node of left child , key  and right child .

The split algorithm is as follows:

 function split(T, k)
     if (T = nil) return (nil, false, nil)
     (L, (m, c), R) = expose(T)
     if (k = m) return (L, true, R)
     if (k < m) 
        (L', b, R') = split(L, k)
        return (L', b, join(R', m, R))
     if (k > m) 
        (L', b, R') = split(R, k)
        return (join(L, m, L'), b, R))

The following recursive function computes this union:

 function union(t1, t2):
     if t1 = nil:
         return t2
     if t2 = nil:
         return t1
     t<, t> ← split t2 on t1.root
     return join(union(left(t1), t<), t1.root, union(right(t1), t>))

Here, Split is presumed to return two trees: one holding the keys less its input key, one holding the greater keys. (The algorithm is non-destructive, but an in-place destructive version exists as well.)

The algorithm for intersection or difference is similar, but requires the Join2 helper routine that is the same as Join but without the middle key. Based on the new functions for union, intersection or difference, either one key or multiple keys can be inserted to or deleted from the weight-balanced tree. Since Split and Union call Join but do not deal with the balancing criteria of weight-balanced trees directly, such an implementation is usually called the join-based algorithms.

This complexity is optimal in terms of the number of comparisons. More importantly, since the recursive calls to union, intersection or difference are independent of each other, they can be executed in parallel with a parallel depth . When , the join-based implementation has the same computational directed acyclic graph (DAG) as single-element insertion and deletion if the root of the larger tree is used to split the smaller tree.

Notes

References

Search trees

de:Balancierter Baum#Balance der Knotenzahl